The 2020 St. Petersburg Open is a tennis tournament played on indoor hard courts that is part of the 2020 ATP Tour. It is the 25th edition of the St. Petersburg Open. The tournament was originally scheduled to take place from September 21 to 27, 2020, but was moved to October 12–18, and, since the ongoing COVID-19 pandemic caused many tournaments to be cancelled, upgraded to ATP 500 level for this one year. It is taking place at the Sibur Arena in Saint Petersburg, Russia.

Singles main-draw entrants

Seeds

 1 Rankings are as of September 28, 2020

Other entrants
The following players received wildcards into the singles main draw:
  Evgeny Donskoy 
  Aslan Karatsev
  Roman Safiullin

The following player received entry using a protected ranking into the singles main draw:
  Mackenzie McDonald

The following players received entry from the qualifying draw:
  Ilya Ivashka
  Pavel Kotov
  Nino Serdarušić
  J. J. Wolf

The following players received entry as a lucky loser:
  Emilio Gómez
  Viktor Troicki

Withdrawals
Before the tournament
  Kevin Anderson → replaced by  Alexander Bublik
  Matteo Berrettini → replaced by  Mikhail Kukushkin
  Pablo Carreño Busta → replaced by  Feliciano López
  Grigor Dimitrov → replaced by  Cameron Norrie
  David Goffin → replaced by  Emilio Gómez
  Kei Nishikori → replaced by  Vasek Pospisil
  Sam Querrey → replaced by  Viktor Troicki
  Stefanos Tsitsipas → replaced by  Egor Gerasimov

Doubles main-draw entrants

Seeds

 Rankings are as of September 20, 2020

Other entrants
The following pairs received wildcards into the doubles main draw:
  Jonathan Erlich /  Andrei Vasilevski 
  Daniil Golubev /  Evgenii Tiurnev

The following pair received entry from the qualifying draw:
  Evgeny Donskoy /  Roman Safiullin

The following pair received entry as lucky losers:
  James Duckworth /  Ilya Ivashka

Withdrawals
Before the tournament
  Sam Querrey
During the tournament
  James Duckworth

Finals

Singles

  Andrey Rublev def.  Borna Ćorić, 7–6(7–5), 6–4

Doubles

  Jürgen Melzer /  Édouard Roger-Vasselin def.  Marcelo Demoliner /  Matwé Middelkoop, 6–2, 7–6(7–4)

References

External links
Official website

St. Petersburg Open
St Petersburg Open
St Petersburg Open
St. Petersburg Open
St. Petersburg